Peter J. Braam is a Dutch-American computer scientist, mathematician and entrepreneur focused on large-scale computing. As an academic, Braam held senior faculty positions at the University of Utah, Oxford, Carnegie Mellon, and visiting or adjunct positions at the University of British Columbia, the Chinese Academy of Sciences and the University of Cambridge.

Transitioning into the computing industry, Braam created the Lustre parallel file system, which has become a key product for large-scale HPC. He founded or co-founded 6 startups and held executive roles at public companies including Turbolinux, Sun Microsystems, and Xyratex. From 2013, he has contributed to the computing architecture for the SKA telescope and has researched solutions for data-intensive computing.

Early life and education 
Braam was born in Utrecht, Netherlands. His undergraduate and postgraduate studies took place at Utrecht University and the University of Oxford. He was a doctoral student of Sir Michael Atiyah at Oxford, and obtained a DPhil (PhD) in 1987 for a thesis entitled Magnetic Monopoles and Hyperbolic Three-manifolds.

Career and research

1980–1997 education, mathematics 
In 1987 Braam became a Junior Research Fellow at Merton College, Oxford, and a C&C Huygens Fellow of the Netherlands Science Foundation. He became a tenured associate professor at University of Utah, then a university lecturer and tutorial fellow at St Catherine's College, Oxford University (1990–1997).

Braam worked under the supervision of Michael Atiyah and many other mathematicians including Hans Duistermaat, Simon Donaldson, and Graeme Segal and he published papers on differential topology, gauge theories, conformal field theories, algebraic geometry and partial differential equations.

Braam's students included; Jacob Kalkman, Jorge Devoto, Ian McAllister, Daniel Elton, Carlos Valero, Matthew Selby and Sharad Agnihorti.

Working directly with Watts Humphrey, he took extensive formal and accredited training at the Software Engineering Institute (SEI) in managing software engineering, architecture, and evaluation.

1997–2012 computing startups and acquisitions 
Braam started teaching for the Computing Laboratory in Oxford University (1994–1996), followed by taking up a Senior Systems Scientist Faculty position at Carnegie Mellon School of Computer Science from 1997 to 2005, where he took over leadership of the Coda project. During this time he created the InterMezzo file system and laid the foundation for Lustre.

In 1999, Braam introduced Lustre, an open-source parallel distributed file system mainly used for supercomputing and is offered as a service in Amazon Web Services. Since June 2005, it has consistently been used by at least half of the top ten, and more than 60 of the top 100 fastest supercomputers in the world., including the world's No. 2 and No. 3 ranked TOP500 supercomputers in 2014.

Braam founded or co-founded 6 startup companies of which 4 had their assets acquired. He has served in senior executive positions at Turbolinux, Sun Microsystems, and Xyratex. Lustre remains the best known legacy having become the de facto file system for HPC, allowing Braam to work with hundreds of the world's largest research computing facilities, and dozens of the largest IT companies who resold Lustre. During this period, he contributed to and designed several other storage products of which several reached the market. This includes key features of Linux's Ext4 file system, the InterMezzo technology which was licensed by two startups using it as their base technology, an MLS secure storage system for the US Department of Defense (DOD) and new approaches to RAID.  He introduced architectures targeting exa-scale storage architectures such as Colibri which Xyratex acquired and became Seagate's Mero product. He founded and led the Exascale IO Workgroup (EIOW) which influenced other projects. He was one of the founding advisors creating the EC Horizon 2020 Exascale program in 2012.

2013–present scientific and computing consultant 
Since 2013, Braam has worked as a scientific consultant with Cambridge University on the Square Kilometer Array (SKA) radio telescope project, studying programming language frameworks and computer architecture to address performance problems and created industrial relations. He introduced the SEI software processes into the SKA project. As a consultant he advised partners in the European Processor Initiative.  From 2019, Braam has been a visiting professor of physics at Oxford University.

Philanthropic activities 
Braam has been involved with different philanthropic activities. He has endowed the Peter J Braam Junior Research Fellowship and Graduate Scholarship in Human Well Being at Merton College, Oxford, and made a Bequest for a larger effort in this area. These projects have supported the creation of a series of Early Career Fellowships at Merton, as well as at other colleges and departments at the University.

Awards and recognition 
 1999 LinuxWorld, Editors Choice Award for Coda File System (best data management software)
 1999 Best Paper, Systems, O'Reilly Open Source Convention, (InterMezzo)
 1994–1995 Special Lectureship, University of Oxford
 1993 Royal Society Exchange Fellowship to visit UBC, Canada
 1986 Wolfson College, Oxford, Graduate Scholarship
 1985 British Council and Foreign Office graduate scholarship
 1984 Outstanding Research Award, University of Utrecht

Selected publications

References

Living people
1962 births
20th-century Dutch mathematicians
21st-century Dutch scientists
Carnegie Mellon University faculty
Fellows of Merton College, Oxford
Academics of the University of Oxford
Fellows of St Catherine's College, Oxford
Alumni of Merton College, Oxford
Alumni of St Catherine's College, Oxford
Alumni of Wolfson College, Oxford